Hubert Ebner (26 March 1906 – 26 June 1990) was a German cyclist. He competed in the individual and team road race events at the 1932 Summer Olympics.

References

External links
 

1906 births
1990 deaths
German male cyclists
Olympic cyclists of Germany
Cyclists at the 1932 Summer Olympics
Place of birth missing
People from Orange Beach, Alabama
People from Waldshut (district)
Sportspeople from Freiburg (region)
Cyclists from Baden-Württemberg
20th-century German people